Aspen Dental Management, Inc. (ADMI) is an American dental support organization (DSO), a dental practice management corporation that provides business support and administrative services in the US. Its headquarters is in Chicago, Illinois.

History

Aspen Dental Management, Inc. (ADMI) was founded in 1994 by Robert Fontana, who is chief executive. Fontana completed business school in 1991 and worked at Upstate Dental in Syracuse, New York. It was a founding member of the Association of Dental Support Organizations (ADSO). After predecessor company Upstate Dental merged with East Coast Dental in December 1997, the resulting firm was launched in 1994 as Aspen Dental Management, Inc.

There were more than 50 Aspen Dental offices within five years of ADMI's establishment. By April 2007, there were 106 branded practices in Arizona, Connecticut, Indiana, Maine, Massachusetts, New Hampshire, New York, Ohio, Pennsylvania, and Rhode Island. The company was initially headquartered in Salina, New York but moved to a new headquarters near Syracuse in DeWitt in 2006. The new headquarters includes a training center to cater to Aspen Dental employees and other firms' training events.

In 2010, Leonard Green & Partners purchased Aspen Dental from Ares Management for about $500 million. By August 2010, private equity firms were bidding on Aspen Dental and Kool Smiles, the two largest national chains of dental offices in the United States. 

Between October 2010 and July 2015, Aspen settled with state consumer protection authorities in Pennsylvania, New York and Massachusetts and agreed to pay reimbursements to former patients and financial contributions to consumer protection probes in those states without admitting fault or wrongdoing.

In June 2012, a PBS series entitled Dollars and Dentists produced by Frontline in partnership with the Center for Public Integrity described Aspen Dental's business model as one which makes dental work immediately accessible to low-income patients by providing interest-free credit. The investigation revealed patients were overcharged or given unnecessary treatments. 

In 2015 the United States District Court for the Northern District of New York dismissed a class-action lawsuit accused the company of illegally owning dental practices and deceiving patients.  The lawsuit accused Aspen of violating of laws in 22 states which allow only dentists to own a dental practice.

In 2015, as Moody's was placing Aspen's ratings under review, an affiliate of private equity firm American Securities, led the recapitalization of Aspen Dental Management Inc. in partnership with Ares Management, Leonard Green & Partners and the existing management team.

In December 2020, lawsuits were filed against Aspen for negligence after an employee allegedly hid cameras in the office washroom at a practice in Illinois.

In June of 2021, Aspen Dental hired Dr. Jahnavi Rao DDS MS(ortho), a well known orthodontist who had recently completed the sale of her dental practices to another DSO group to help spearhead the introduction of the motto clear aligners to all the Aspen Dental locations throughout the country. Dr. Rao joins Aspen Dental as their Vice President of Orthodontics overseeing the management, marketing, and clinical oversight of the motto clear aligners to all of the Aspen Dental treating locations.

Client-base

Aspen's services are aimed at individuals who do not have an established dental routine or regular dental provider. In 2012, Fontana described a typical Aspen Dental patient as middle-aged and possibly struggling to afford their day-to-day expenses, or someone who sees dental work as "discretionary" and therefore may have an emergency dental issue arise. According to Fontana, Aspen's locations and marketing are aimed at providing services to those individuals.

See also

All Smiles Dental Centers 
Kool Smiles 
ReachOut Healthcare America 
Small Smiles Dental Centers 
Smile Starters 
Sun Orthodontix 
ZocDoc

References

External links
Aspen Dental website

Dental companies of the United States
Health care companies established in 1998
Companies based in Onondaga County, New York
1998 establishments in New York (state)
DeWitt, New York
2010 mergers and acquisitions
Health care companies based in New York (state)